Jarne Steuckers (born 4 February 2002) is a Belgian professional footballer who plays as a midfielder for Eerste Divisie club MVV, on loan from Sint-Truiden.

Club career
Steuckers was born and raised in Sint-Truiden, Limburg. He started his youth training at Sint-Truidense VV, the professional football club from his hometown. In 2012, he moved to the youth team of Genk, but returned to Sint-Truiden four years later, where he signed his first professional contract in May 2020.

After impressing with the U23s, coach Peter Maes promoted Steuckers to the first-team squad in January 2021. On 17 January 2021, he made his official debut in the Belgian Pro League in the home game against Oud-Heverlee Leuven. In the 72th minute, Steuckers replaced Yuma Suzuki as Sint-Truiden were up 3-1 which was also the final result in the match. Later that season, he was given more playing opportunities by Maes. On 3 February 2021, for example, he made his first ever start in a Belgian Cup match against Lokeren-Temse. On the penultimate matchday of the regular season, Steuckers, who had been sidelined with a COVID-19 infection a month earlier, was given his first starting berth in the Belgian Pro League against his former youth club Genk.

Steuckers put in strong performances during the 2021–22 pre-season under new coach Bernd Hollerbach, but a foot injury threw a spanner in the works. In late November 2021 he made his comeback in a friendly. Under Hollerbach, he struggled to return to first-team action and he made no appearances the remainder of the season.

He signed a new contract with Sint-Truiden in July 2022, and was sent on a season-long loan to Dutch second-tier Eerste Divisie club MVV on 4 August 2022. Sint-Truiden announced on 9 February 2023 that Steuckers would return to the club after his loan spell, where he had impressed as a starter.

Career statistics

References

External links
 

2002 births
People from Sint-Truiden
Footballers from Limburg (Belgium)
Living people
Belgian footballers
Association football forwards
Sint-Truidense V.V. players
MVV Maastricht players
Belgian Pro League players
Eerste Divisie players
Belgian expatriate footballers
Expatriate footballers in the Netherlands
Belgian expatriate sportspeople in the Netherlands